Shafiq Kagimu (born 28 May 1998) is a Ugandan international footballer who plays for Uganda Revenue Authority as a midfielder.

Club career
Born in Nsambya, he played youth football for Zebra FC, Kampala Junior Team and Water FC. He began his senior career with Uganda Revenue Authority in 2015. At the end of the 2016–17 season he was nominated for the 'Best Midfielder' award at the UPL Awards. In April 2019 he said that he was being played in more attacking roles, resulting in better form and more goals.

International career
Kagimu played for Uganda U20 during the  COSAFA U-20 Tournament which was held in Zambia in 2017. He made his debut on 6 December 2017 against Zambia U20 at Arthur Davies Stadium, Kitwe.

Kagimu has played for Uganda U23 during the TOTAL AFCON U-23 Qualifiers. He made his debut on 14 November 2018 against South Sudan U23 at Star Times Stadium Lugogo, Uganda U23 won the game 1-0.

He made his senior international debut for Uganda in 2017.

Personal life
He is nicknamed "Kuchi". He studied for a degree in Procurement and Logistics management at Kampala University.

References

1998 births
Living people
Ugandan footballers
Uganda international footballers
Uganda Revenue Authority SC players
Uganda Premier League players
Association football midfielders
Uganda A' international footballers
2020 African Nations Championship players